Jana Burmeister (born 6 March 1989 in Sonneberg) is a German football goalkeeper. She started her senior career at FF USV Jena and from 2005 to 2011 played 53 2nd Bundesliga and 60 Bundesliga games. In 2011, she transferred to Wolfsburg.

Honours 

FF USV Jena
DFB-Pokal: Runner-up 2009–10
VfL Wolfsburg
 Bundesliga: Winner (3) 2012-2013, 2013-2014, 2016-2017
 DFB-Pokal: Winner (4) 2012-2013, 2014-2015, 2015-2016, 2016-2017
 UEFA Women's Champions League: Winner (2) 2012-2013, 2013-2014

References

External links

1989 births
Living people
German women's footballers
FF USV Jena players
VfL Wolfsburg (women) players
Women's association football goalkeepers
People from Sonneberg
Footballers from Thuringia